Thomas Proulx is an American computer programmer and entrepreneur. He was a co-founder and first programmer of Intuit and a pioneer of usability testing in the 1980s. He was the main programmer of the first version of Quicken and the prime mover of its successful merger with TurboTax. He co-founded Intuit in 1983, and was later involved with NetPulse.

Early life and education
He earned an electrical engineering degree from Stanford University and was a Hughes Fellow.

Career

Intuit

In 1983, he began designing Quicken in his dorm room at Stanford.

In 1983 Scott Cook went to Stanford University in California, United States. He wanted a programmer for a planned home bill payment and bank reconciliation program. Proulx, who studied Electrical Engineering/Computer Science at Stanford, was the first person Cook met and they soon co-founded Intuit. Proulx was the first and foremost programmer of the first version of Quicken and the first Apple and Radio Shack versions. He obtained a patent for finding a way for a computer to verify that a user had correctly inserted blank checks in a dot matrix printer. This was essential to the near universal use of such checks in accounting programs.

After he co-founded Intuit in 1983, the company ran into financial difficulties, with staff working at one point for nine months without pay.

In 1984, in what may have been the first case of usability testing with engineers, Intuit recruited people off the street to test Quicken with a stopwatch. After each test Proulx improved Quicken. Before this, experienced computer users spent an hour or more installing programs and print a check. Novices often gave up. Quicken let newbies do it in less than 15 minutes, printing checks faster than it took to write them. The market share of Quicken varied from 65% to 98%, making it a killer application, which drove many computer sales. It also made usability testing a standard industry practice.

In 1985, the company lost key employees due to a lack of funds, with Proulx as one of four remaining employees working for free for six months. They worked on Quicken, which they used to create an advertising revenue stream. In 1985, while Proulx was one of three Intuit employees, Intuit became the first company to shrink wrap floppy disks and manuals. This further revolutionized software development. By 1992, all major Intuit programs had a market share of 75% or more. Proulx created an Intuit credit card with a download service, that automatically classified charges. Proulx was a recipient of the Inc. Magazine Entrepreneur of the Year Award in 1992. In 1993, he actively assisted with helping Intuit go public and was the driving force behind its Chip Soft TurboTax merger. He resigned soon after.

He retired from Intuit in 1994. Afterwards, he became a private investor in several startup companies.

Netpulse
He co-founded Netpulse, Inc. In June 2000, Netpulse E-Zone Media Networks was formed out of E-Zone Networks, Netpulse Communications, and Xystos Media Networks in a merger. The CEO was Andrew Wiswell. In July 2000, he was serving as Netpulse CEO.

Proulx was the Chairman of Netpulse from 2001 to 2018. In 2008, the company filed for Chapter 7 bankruptcy protection. Three months later, Tom Proulx came out of retirement and "traded his creditorship for the company’s remaining assets," announced on May 3 in San Francisco, and made the company solvent again.

Boards and committees
By 2004, he had been a director on the boards of tech startups such as UpShot, Documagix, and NextSet. He was the chairman of Netpulse. On December 14, 2004, he was named a director of Izalex Incorporated. He remains on the boards of eGym, and served on the boards of iControl, Plumchoice, and Dropwater. In 2021, he was also involved with 1047 Games, founded by his son Ian.

Personal life
As of 2017, he has an estate in Atherton, California. He has two children.

Political involvement
Wired noted in late 1996 that Proulx "began Silicon Valley's anti-211 crusade. This spring, Proulx raised $12 million from friends in the high tech industry to pass ballot initiatives. It would have made California courts the most inhospitable in the nation to securities fraud suits. But in March they went down in flames. A political neophyte, Proulx admits to some mistakes. The current campaign to defeat 211 is more broad-based than his fledgling effort earlier this year." By that November, the California Technology Alliance group had "hired a lobbyist to represent it in the state capital."

References

External links 
 Intuit photos, including Tom Proulx and Scott Cook in their first formal portrait, 1989.

Year of birth missing (living people)
Living people
Stanford University alumni
American computer programmers
American computer scientists
Businesspeople in computing
Silicon Valley people
Intuit people
American technology company founders